Aroma Espresso Bar is an Israeli espresso and coffee chain with 162 branches around the country, and several branches in the United States, Canada, Kazakhstan, and Ukraine.

History
Founded in 1994 on Hillel Street in downtown Jerusalem by brothers Yariv and Sahar Shefa, Aroma first started branching out beyond that city in 2000, following a 1999 dispute between the two brothers which led to the formation of separate chains, Aroma Tel Aviv (run by Sahar) operating in Tel Aviv-Yafo, and Aroma Israel (run by Yariv) operating in the rest of the world. Despite being separate companies, the two chains maintain similar branding, creating a misconception of being a common entity, up to the point that Aroma Israel put labels on its products emphasizing the lack of "business, logistical or management links" between the two  following a food poisoning incident in an Aroma Tel Aviv branch.

In 2006 the first overseas branch opened in SoHo in New York City. In 2007 Aroma opened its first location in Canada, in downtown Toronto in The Annex. In the following years, branches continued to open in Toronto and on 72nd Street in New York City, as well as the first location in Kyiv, Ukraine. Aroma has 46 Canadian locations in Ontario (mostly in Greater Toronto Area), as well as five US locations across New York City (1), New Jersey (1), Maryland (1), and Florida (2). Aroma has since closed its locations in New York City and Maryland.

Social responsibility
In 1996, Aroma's first branch in Jerusalem began integrating workers with special needs. Today the chain employs such people in nearly every branch in the country.

Comparison surveys
A survey by an Israeli market research company found that more Israeli consumers are inclined to choose a cafe based on accessibility and availability, ahead of cost and taste of the food. According to Haaretz newspaper, this may explain the success of Aroma, which has 153 outlets in Israel. Respondents were asked which chain they thought had the cheapest prices and best service. Aroma won by a wide margin.

See also

Café Café
Café Hillel
Cofix
Economy of Israel
List of coffeehouse chains
List of restaurants in Israel

References

External links

Aroma website 
Marrone Rosse website 
Aroma USA

Food and drink companies of Israel
Restaurants established in 1994
Israeli brands
Restaurant chains in Israel
Coffeehouses and cafés in Israel
Israeli companies established in 1994